Patrick Scott may refer to:
Patrick Scott (artist) (1921–2014), Irish artist
Patrick Scott (American football) (born 1964), former professional American football player
Patrick J. Scott (1848–1899), Canadian lawyer and politician
Patrick Scot or Scott (fl. 1620), Scottish author

See also
Scott (name)
Scott (disambiguation)